Terry R. Ferrell (born 1962) is a retired lieutenant general in the United States Army, who last served as the commanding general of United States Army Central from March 8, 2019 to August 4, 2021. A native of Logan, West Virginia, Ferrell is a graduate of Marshall University and was commissioned in 1984. He is married to Robbie Woods Ferrell, a retired Army colonel.

He relinquished command of U.S. Army Central to Ronald P. Clark on August 4, 2021 and held his retirement ceremony the same day.

References

1962 births
United States Army personnel of the Iraq War
Central Michigan University alumni
Living people
Marshall University alumni
Recipients of the Defense Superior Service Medal
Recipients of the Distinguished Service Medal (US Army)
Recipients of the Legion of Merit
Recipients of the Silver Star
Recipients of the Meritorious Service Medal (United States)
United States Army generals
United States Army War College alumni